Ndiaga Dieng (born 17 July 1999) is a Senegalese and Italian para-athlete of Senegalese descent who represented Italy at the 2020 Summer Paralympics.

Career
Of Senegalese and later acquired Italian citizenship, Dieng represented Italy at the 2020 Summer Paralympics in the 1500 metres T20 event and won a bronze medal. He competed at the 2020 Italian U23 Palaindoor Ancona, and 2021 Palaindoor Ancona, in 800 metres and 1500 metres.

See also
 Italy at the 2020 Summer Paralympics

References

External links
 

Living people
1999 births
Medalists at the World Para Athletics European Championships
Athletes (track and field) at the 2020 Summer Paralympics
Medalists at the 2020 Summer Paralympics
Paralympic bronze medalists for Italy
Paralympic medalists in athletics (track and field)
Italian male middle-distance runners